ACAS or Acas may refer to:

Aviation
 Airborne collision avoidance system, an International Civil Aviation Organization standard
 Assistant Chief of the Air Staff, a senior appointment in the Royal Air Force

Other uses
 Aboriginal Children's Advancement Society, an organization in New South Wales
 Acas (Advisory, Conciliation and Arbitration Service), an independent non-departmental public body of the Government of the UK
 Acâș, a commune in Satu Mare County, Romania
 Acas District, Ocros, Peru
 Associate in the Casualty Actuarial Society, a level of membership in the Casualty Actuarial Society
 Assured Compliance Assessment Solution, a tool that automatically identifies configuration vulnerabilities on United States Department of Defense computer systems

See also 
 Akas (disambiguation)